Attribute-oriented programming (@OP) is a technique for embedding metadata, namely attributes, within program code.

Attribute-oriented programming in various languages

Java 
With the inclusion of Metadata Facility for Java (JSR-175) into the J2SE 5.0 release it is possible to utilize attribute-oriented programming right out of the box.
XDoclet library makes it possible to use attribute-oriented programming approach in earlier versions of Java.

C# 
The C# language has supported attributes from its very first release. These attributes was used to give run-time information and are not used by a preprocessor. Currently with source generators, you can use attributes to drive generation of additional code at compile-time.

UML 
The Unified Modeling Language (UML) supports a kind of attribute called stereotypes.

Hack 
The Hack programming language supports attributes. Attributes can be attached to various program entities, and information about those attributes can be retrieved at run-time via reflection.

Tools 
 Annotation Processing Tool (apt)
 Spoon, an Annotation-Driven Java Program Transformer
 XDoclet, a Javadoc-Driven Program Generator

References

External links
 Don Schwarz. Peeking Inside the Box: Attribute-Oriented Programming with Java5
 Sun JSR 175
 Attributes and Reflection - sample chapter from Programming C# book
 Modeling Turnpike Project
 Fraclet: An annotation-based programming model for the Fractal component model
 Attribute Enabled Software Development book

Programming paradigms